is a subway station on the Tokyo Metro Hanzōmon Line in Chiyoda, Tokyo, Japan, operated by the Tokyo subway operator Tokyo Metro. It is located near the Hanzōmon Gate of the Imperial Palace.

The station was the eastern terminal of the Hanzōmon Line from 1982 to 1989 and is still used as a terminal for some morning rush hour trains. It is the only station on the Hanzōmon Line not to connect with any other subway or railway lines; however, it is a five-minute walk from Kōjimachi Station on the Tokyo Metro Yurakucho Line.

Station layout

History
The station opened on 9 December 1982.

The station facilities were inherited by Tokyo Metro after the privatization of the Teito Rapid Transit Authority (TRTA) in 2004.

References

External links

  

Railway stations in Japan opened in 1982
Railway stations in Tokyo
Tokyo Metro Hanzomon Line